Low is an English and Scottish surname. Notable people with the surname include:

Abiel Abbot Low (1811–1893), American entrepreneur and philanthropist
Sir Alan Low (1916–1999), New Zealand economist
Albert Peter Low (1861–1942), Canadian geologist and athlete
Alice Low (suffragist),  OBE (1877–1954), British suffragist
Alice Low (1926 – 2012), American author, lyricist, and editor.
A. (Archibald) M. Low (1888–1956), British scientist and inventor
Bartlett Marshall Low (1839-1893), American businessman and politician
Charles Low, 2nd Baron Aldington (born 1948), British banker
Dave Low (died 1916), Australian rules footballer
David Low (agriculturalist) (1786–1859), Scottish agriculturalist
David Low (cartoonist) (1891–1963), New Zealand political cartoonist
Drury Low (born 1990), New Zealand Rugby League player
Edward Low (1690–1724), English pirate
Evan Low (born 1983), American politician
Francis E. Low (1921—2007), American theoretical physicist
Frank J. Low (1933–2009), American physicist
G. David Low (1956–2008), American astronaut
George Low (1926–1984), American NASA administrator
George Low (Medal of Honor) (1847–1912), U.S. Navy sailor
Harriet Low (1809–1877), American diarist
Henry R. Low (1826–1888), New York politician
Hugh Low (1824–1905), British colonial administrator and naturalist
Juliette Gordon Low (1860–1927), founder of the Girl Scouts of the USA
Norman Low (1914–1994), Scottish footballer and football manager
Penelope Margaret Low (born 1933), birth name of British writer Penelope Lively
Rochelle Low (born 1969), Canadian field hockey player
Seth Low (1850–1916), American educator and politician
Stewart Low, Scottish footballer
Low Thia Khiang (born 1956), Singaporean politician and businessman
Toby Low, 1st Baron Aldington (1914–2000), British politician and businessman
Tommy Low (born 1874), Scottish footballer
Trisha Low, American author and poet
Vanessa Low (born 1990), German athlete
Vincent Warren Low (1867–1942), British surgeon
Willie Low (1889–1970), Scottish footballer

Fictional character 
Axl Low, a character in the Guilty Gear video game series
 Low-Fa, character in Laura Bow 2

See also
Atkin & Low family tree, showing the relationship between some of the above
Löw, listing people surnamed Löw
Liu (surname), Chinese surname
Luo (surname), Chinese surname

English-language surnames
Scottish surnames